Boyarin Orsha is a 1909 Russian drama film directed by Pyotr Chardynin.

Plot 

The film tells about the boyar, returning to his native estate after the service of Ivan the Terrible. One day, he becomes a witness of his daughter’s meeting with his adopted son Arseny, which makes him furious...

Cast 
 Andrey Gromov as Arseniy
 Pyotr Chardynin as Orsha
 Aleksandra Goncharova as Orsha's daughter

References

External links 
 

1909 films
1900s Russian-language films
1909 drama films
Russian drama films